Schizooura is a genus of basal ornithuromorph bird known from the Early Cretaceous of Jianchang, western Liaoning, China. Its remains were discovered in Jiufotang Formation deposits, dated to 120 million years ago.

References

Early Cretaceous birds of Asia
Fossil taxa described in 2012
Jiufotang fauna
Prehistoric euornitheans